Naked Truth is the debut studio album by American singer-songwriter Sarah Hudson. It was released on September 7, 2004, through EMI Records and S-Curve Records.

Track #6, "Unlove You", was covered by Ashley Tisdale on her 2007 debut album "Headstrong".

Track listing

Personnel
Sarah Hudson - vocal, background vocals
John R. Angier - piano
Eric Bazilian - guitar
Cindy Blackman - drums
Gordon Brown - guitar
Desmond Child - background vocals
Jack Daley - bass
Doug Emery - keyboard
Jimmy Farkas - synthesizer, guitar, Wurlitzer
Steve Greenwell - bass, keyboard
Mark Hudson - guitar
Storm Lee - background vocals
Jon Leidersdorff - drums
Lee Levin - drums
Michael Mangini - keyboard
Billy Mann - acoustic guitar, slide guitar
Jodi Marr - background vocals
Rob Mueller - guitar
Shelly Peiken - background vocals
Paul Pimsler - electric guitar
Christopher Rojas - keyboard programming, drum programming
Steven Tyler - background vocals
Dan Warner - guitar
Steven Wolf - drums

Production
Producers: Randy Cantor, Desmond Child, Michael Mangini, Billy Mann, Jodi Marr, Guy Roche
Executive producer: Joanna Ifrah
Engineers: Carlos Alvarez, Dushyant Bhakta, Conrad Golding, Jules Gondar, Steve Greenwell, Greg Landon, Craig Lozowick, Nathan Malki, Marcelo Marulanda
Mixing: Carlos Alvarez, Steve Greenwell, Chris Lord-Alge
Mixing assistant: Dim e
Mastering: Ted Jensen
Programming: Doug Emery, Steve Greenwell, Michael Mangini, Billy Mann, Christopher Rojas, Pete Wallace
Drum programming: Lee Levin
Production coordination: Brian Coleman
Arrangers: Billy Mann, Christopher Rojas, Pete Wallace
Illustrations: Rick Cortes
Photography: Sheryl Nields

References 

Sarah Hudson (singer) albums
2004 debut albums
Albums produced by Desmond Child
Albums produced by Guy Roche